Nihalgarh  is a village located in Phagwara Tehsil, Kapurthala district in Punjab, India. The village is administered by a sarpanch, an elected representative.

Demography 
As of 2011, Nihalgarh has 92 houses with a population of 479 people, with 250 men and 229 women. The literacy rate of  Nihalgarh is 78.14%, higher than the state average of 75.84%.  Children 0–6 years number 49, which is 10.23% of the total population. The child sex ratio is approximately 1130, higher than the state average of 846.

Transport 
The nearest railway stations to Nihalgarh are Phagwara Junction Railway Station and Mauli Halt Railway Station. Jalandhar Railway station is 24 km away from the village. Nihalgarh is 117 km away from Sri Guru Ram Dass Jee International Airport in Amritsar, while Ludhiana Airport is located 37 km away. Phagwara, Jandiala, Jalandhar, and Phillaur are the closest urban centres to Nihalgarh.

References

External links
  Villages in Kapurthala
 Kapurthala Villages List
 Nihalgarh, Indian Village Directory

Villages in Kapurthala district